The 1994 Scottish League Cup final was played on 27 November 1994, at Ibrox Stadium in Glasgow and was the final of the 49th Scottish League Cup competition. The final was contested by Raith Rovers and Celtic. Raith Rovers won the final on a penalty shootout after the match ended in a 2–2 draw.

Match details

References

External links
 Soccerbase

1994
League Cup Final
Scottish League Cup Final 1994
Scottish League Cup Final 1994
1990s in Glasgow
Scottish League Cup Final 1994
November 1994 sports events in the United Kingdom